Joel Tudor is a surfer, primarily known for longboarding, and competitive grappler from San Diego, California.

Biography

Professional Surf career
Tudor became a professional surfer at 14 and won his first professional ASP competition at age 15, making him the youngest competitor to win an ASP event.

He rode a longboard, and in 1998 he won his first ASP Longboard World Championship in the Canary Islands. He won the U.S. Open of longboarding 8 times, and won the ASP Longboard World Championship for the second time in 2004.

Grappling
Joel Tudor is also a Brazilian jiu-jitsu Black Belt under Carlson Gracie Black Belt and World Champion, Rodrigo Medeiros / BJJ Revolution Team. He is also an ADCC veteran.

Other Projects
In 2010, he founded the international Longboard Competition called the Duct Tape Invitational.

Publications
During 1999 - 2004 Tudor collaborated with photographer Michael Halsband to create Surf Book, a homage to the architects of contemporary surf culture.  Tudor's text accompanied Halsband's photographs.  The book was designed by Doug Lloyd and edited by Scott Hulet.  Additional text was written by C.R. Stecyk.

Documentaries
Joel Tudor is featured in the art film "Surf Movie: reels 1- 14" shot in 8mm by Michael Halsband, "Shelter" a 16mm film by Chris Malloy, "The Seedling", "Sprout", and "The Present" 16mm surfing films by Thomas Campbell and the super 16mm film, "One California Day" by Jason Baffa and Mark Jeremias.

References

External links 
 Surfhistory bio - listing him as one of just 24 surfing Legends - and with brief video interview
 Surfline bio

American surfers
Living people
1976 births